1631 Kopff, provisional designation , is a stony Florian asteroid from the inner regions of the asteroid belt, approximately 9 kilometers in diameter. It was discovered on 11 October 1936, by Finnish astronomer Yrjö Väisälä at Turku Observatory in Southwest Finland. It was later named after German astronomer August Kopff.

Classification and orbit 

Kopff is a member of the Flora family, one of the largest collisional families of stony S-type asteroid. It orbits the Sun in the inner main-belt at a distance of 1.8–2.7 AU once every 3 years and 4 months (1,220 days). Its orbit has an eccentricity of 0.21 and an inclination of 7° with respect to the ecliptic.

Physical characteristics

Rotation period 

In November 2003, a rotational lightcurve of Kopff was obtained from remote photometric observations at the Tenagra and Tenagra II Observatories. Lightcurve analysis gave a well-defined rotation period of 6.683 hours with a brightness variation of 0.41 magnitude.

Diameter and albedo 

According to the surveys carried out by the Infrared Astronomical Satellite IRAS, the Japanese Akari satellite, and NASA's Wide-field Infrared Survey Explorer with its subsequent NEOWISE mission, Kopff measures between 8.64 and 9.66 kilometers in diameter and its surface has an albedo between 0.2497 and 0.342. The Collaborative Asteroid Lightcurve Link derives an albedo of 0.271 and a diameter of 9.71 kilometers, with an absolute magnitude of 12.1.

Naming 

This minor planet was named for German astronomer August Kopff (1882–1960). He was first an assistant to Max Wolf, and became later a prolific discoverer of minor planets himself. In 1924, Kopff became Director of the Astronomisches Rechen-Institut in Berlin, and, after the western section moved to Heidelberg, he also became director of the Heidelberg Observatory. Under his leadership, the third Catalogue of Fundamental Stars (FK3) was compiled and the work on the fourth catalogue (FK4) was initiated. The lunar crater Kopff is also named in his honour. The official  was published by the Minor Planet Center on 20 February 1976.

Notes

References

External links 
 Asteroid Lightcurve Database (LCDB), query form (info )
 Dictionary of Minor Planet Names, Google books
 Asteroids and comets rotation curves, CdR – Observatoire de Genève, Raoul Behrend
 Discovery Circumstances: Numbered Minor Planets (1)-(5000) – Minor Planet Center
 
 

001631
Discoveries by Yrjö Väisälä
Named minor planets
19361011